The 2018 Kumho Tyre Australian V8 Touring Car Series was an Australian motor racing competition for de-registered Holden Commodore and Ford Falcon V8 Supercars. It was the 11th running of the series. It commenced at the Phillip Island Grand Prix Circuit on 20 April and concluded at The Bend Motorsport Park on 25 August.

The series was won by Tyler Everingham driving a Ford Falcon FG. Defending series winner Jack Smith ran a part-time schedule, essentially surrendering his title defense.

Teams and drivers
The following teams and drivers contested the series. The initial field consisted of 22 cars, with the notable inclusion of defending series winner Jack Smith. Although, Smith ran a part-time schedule, essentially surrendering his title defense.

Calendar and results 
The calendar expanded upon its support status at Supercars Championship events, with a five-round calendar announced at the end of 2017. The series started at the Phillip Island Grand Prix Circuit on April 20 and concluded at The Bend Motorsport Park on August 25. A non-championship round at the Gold Coast 600 was added after the Stadium Super Truck series was dropped from the program.

References

External links
 

V8 Touring Car National Series
V8 Touring Car Series